This is a list of districts of Istanbul in Turkey as of 31 December 2022. The number of the districts increased from 32 to 39 shortly before the 2009 local elections.

Population

Historical information 
Pera (now Beyoğlu) and Galata in the late 19th and early 20th centuries were a part of the Municipality of the Sixth Circle, established under the laws of 11 Jumada al-Thani (Djem. II) and 24 Shawwal (Chev.) 1274, in 1858; the organisation of the central city in the city walls, "Stamboul", was not affected by these laws. All of Constantinople (all of which today is now Istanbul) was in the Prefecture of the City of Constantinople.

See also 
 List of neighbourhoods of Istanbul

Notes

References 

Districts of Istanbul
 
Istanbul
Districts